Francesco Carnelutti (8 April 1936 - 26 November 2015) was an Italian actor. He appeared in more than sixty films from 1969 to 2014.

Filmography

References

External links 

1936 births
2015 deaths
Italian male film actors